Next Step or Nextstep may refer to:

 NeXTSTEP, a UNIX-based computer operating system developed by NeXT in the 1980s and 1990s
 OpenStep, an open platform version of NeXTSTEP originated by Sun Microsystems and NeXT
 Rhapsody (operating system), the Apple Macintosh NeXTSTEP/classic Mac OS hybrid predecessor to macOS
 Darwin (operating system), the open source version of macOS
 GNUstep, an open source version of NeXTSTEP originated by the GNU Organization
 Next Space Technologies for Exploration Partnerships (NextSTEP), a NASA program
 Next Step Tour, a 1999 tour by the British pop group Steps
 Nextstep (magazine), an American magazine for high school students
 Nextstep, the initial name of Sense of Purpose, a hardcore punk band from Melbourne

See also

 The Next Step (disambiguation)
 NeXstep, a brand of Coca-Cola Co.
 NexStep, a polyurethane product from Interface, Inc.
 
 
 
 Next (disambiguation)
 Step (disambiguation)